The 2004 Open Canada Cup was the 7th edition of the Canadian Professional Soccer League's open league cup tournament running from late May through early September. Windsor Border Stars defeated Ottawa St. Anthony Italia 4-3 in a penalty shootout in the final played at Cove Road Stadium, London, Ontario. The victory marked Windsor's first piece of silverware and became the second expansion club to win the open tournament in their debut season. Ottawa also recorded a milestone by becoming the first amateur team to reach the finals.  The tournament expanded to include a record number of 24 clubs throughout Ontario.

The Ontario amateur clubs began the tournament in the preliminary rounds while the CPSL clubs received an automatic bye to the second round. For the third straight year London City were granted the hosting rights to the finals which granted them a wild card match if they were defeated in the earlier rounds. Toronto Croatia decided for the first time to opt out of the tournament in order to compete in the annual Croatian-North American Soccer Tournament, while the rest of the CPSL clubs competed in the competition.

Qualification

First round

Second round

Quarter-final

Wild Card Game

Semi-final

Final

Top scorers

References 

Open Canada Cup
Open Canada Cup
Open Canada Cup